Mark J. Berg is an American politician from Virginia.

A member of the Republican Party, he was a member of the Virginia House of Delegates for one term, representing the 29th district. In the 2013 elections, he defeated the incumbent Republican and then defeated the Independent opponent Larry Yates. A retired doctor, Berg is affiliated with the Tea Party movement. He was defeated in a primary challenge in the 2015 elections by attorney Chris Collins.

References

External links
 

Living people
Republican Party members of the Virginia House of Delegates
Tea Party movement activists
Year of birth missing (living people)
Place of birth missing (living people)